Major General Philip Sidney Whitcombe (3 October 1893 – 9 August 1989) was an English cricketer active from 1922 to 1931 who played for Essex and in India. He was born in Windsor, Berkshire, and died in Hindhead, Surrey. He appeared in four first-class matches as a righthanded batsman who bowled right arm fast medium pace. He scored 81 runs with a highest score of 32* and took no wickets.

His son Philip Arthur Whitcombe was also a first-class cricketer.

Quoted from Nick Smart, Biographical Dictionary of British Generals of the Second World War, p. 331

"The son of the Bishop of Colchester, Whitcombe was educated at Winchester and was a reserve officer with the Durham Light Infantry in 1914. Transferring to the Army Service Corps, his First War service was in France.

Married in 1919, Whitcombe, a keen games player, played cricket for Essex and the army in the early 1920s. He attended the Staff College, Camberley, 1925–1926, served in India 1928–1929 and was deputy assistant general, Northern Command, 1934–1936. A staff officer at the War Office 1936–1938, he was a lieutenant colonel in 1939.

Mentioned in despatches after the campaign in France and Flanders, in which he served as deputy assistant of supplies and transport with the BEF, Whitcombe was assistant adjutant and QMG in Gibraltar 1940–1941 and brigadier i/c administration 1941–1942. Deputy adjutant and QMG with British troops in Northern Ireland 1942–1943, he was major general i/c administration Eastern Command 1943–1947

Appointed CB in 1944 and retired from the army in 1947, Whitcombe, a member of the MCC, was a JP in Wiltshire from 1948."

Notes

Bibliography

External links
Generals of World War II

1893 births
1989 deaths
English cricketers
Essex cricketers
Europeans cricketers
Berkshire cricketers
Durham Light Infantry officers
Royal Army Service Corps officers
People educated at Winchester College
British Army personnel of World War I
British Army generals of World War II
Graduates of the Staff College, Camberley
Military personnel from Berkshire
English justices of the peace
British Army major generals
British people in colonial India